Alexander Sergeyevich Orlov is a contemporary Russian historian and an author of several handbooks. He is a specialist on socio-political history of Russia in the 18th century, in the history of science and in education about that period.

He graduated at the historical faculty of the M. V. Lomonosov Moscow State University (MGU) in 1965 and in defended his candidates-thesis on the theme "Unrest in the Urals in the 1750s and 1760s and the expedition of Prince Alexander Vyazemsky" in 1971. His thesis was supervised by M.T. Belyavsky. He has worked at the historical faculty since 1968.

He is director of the historical museum of the MGU since 1995.

References
M. V. Lomonosov Moscow State University, School of History. Biography of Alexander Orlov 

Living people
20th-century Russian historians
Moscow State University alumni
Year of birth missing (living people)
21st-century Russian historians